Airbus Helicopters, Inc. (AHI) is a subsidiary of Airbus Group, Inc., the United States subsidiary of Airbus. Airbus Helicopters manufactures and markets a broad range of civil helicopters. With large facilities in Texas and Mississippi and service centers throughout the country, Airbus Helicopters, Inc. has a U.S. footprint of over 860,000 square feet (79,900 m2) and controls over 50% of the U.S. market.

History
The company's history goes back to the now-defunct LTV Corporation. In 1968, Vought Helicopter Inc. (VHI), a subsidiary of LTV, built a facility at the Grand Prairie Municipal Airport in Grand Prairie, Texas, for the purpose of marketing helicopters to North America built by Aérospatiale, the French helicopter manufacturer. However, six years later Aérospatiale bought out VHI and took over its own marketing; two years later it changed VHI's name to Aérospatiale Helicopter Corporation (AHC). In 1980, AHC built its current Grand Prairie facility.

In 1992, DASA of Germany and Aérospatiale merged to form Eurocopter; AHC would become American Eurocopter.

In 2004, the facility in Columbus, Mississippi was opened and in 2006, became the manufacturing facility and home for the U.S. Army's UH-72A Lakota helicopter. The company was renamed Airbus Helicopters, Inc. on January 2, 2014.

US production plants
Airbus Helicopters produces helicopters at two production plants in the US.
 Grand Prairie, Texas
 Grand Prairie serves as the headquarters and main facility for Airbus Helicopters. It is adjacent to Grand Prairie Municipal Airport.
 Grand Prairie also serves as the Airbus Helicopters Training facility for North America with classrooms and full-motion simulators.
 Columbus, Mississippi
 The recently constructed Columbus plant handles repairs, upgrades and customizations of all Airbus Helicopters models. It is located on the Golden Triangle Regional Airport.
 The Columbus facility is also the home of the UH-72A Lakota (military EC145), the new Army helicopter.
Beginning in 2014, Airbus Helicopters will upgrade the Columbus Plant to a final assembly and test site for AS350 helicopters. The plant plans to produce up to 60 additional AS350 helicopters annually by 2016.

References

External links

 Airbus Helicopters
 Airbus Group, Inc.

Companies based in the Dallas–Fort Worth metroplex
Manufacturing companies based in Texas
Helicopter manufacturers of the United States
Airbus subsidiaries and divisions
Airbus Helicopters
Grand Prairie, Texas